Nestlé Purina Petcare, or simply Purina, is an American subsidiary of the Swiss corporation Nestlé, based in St. Louis, Missouri. It produces and markets pet food, treats, cat and dog litter. Some of its pet food brands include Purina Pro Plan, Purina Dog Chow, Friskies, Beneful and Purina One. The company was formed in 2001 by combining Nestlé's Friskies Petcare Company with Ralston Purina, which acquired it for $10.3 billion. , it is the second-largest pet food company globally (with the first being Mars Petcare), and the largest in the United States.

Corporate history

Origins
In 1894, William H. Danforth partnered with George Robinson and William Andrews, as they entered the business of feeding farm animals by founding the Robinson-Danforth Commission Company in St. Louis, Missouri. The name was changed to Ralston Purina in 1902. This was the same year (1902) that Ralston Purina built their first building at the current headquarters, 800 Chouteau Ave, St. Louis, Missouri.
Nestlé Purina Petcare was formed in December 2001, when Nestlé acquired Ralston Purina for $10.3 billion and merged it with Nestlé's pet food business, Friskies PetCare Company. Ralston had marketed the Dog Chow, Cat Chow and Pro Plan pet food brands, while Nestlé produced Friskies and Alpo brand pet foods.

The merger was opposed by consumer advocates, such as the Consumer Federation of America, due to anti-trust concerns. The two companies combined would become the largest pet food brand by market-share with a 45 percent share of the cat food market. The Federal Trade Commission approved the merger after the Meow Mix and Alley Cat brands from Ralston were sold to J.W. Childs Equity Partners, creating the separate Meow Mix Company. Ralston's St. Louis, Missouri location was chosen as the new company's North America headquarters.

Early history
Nestlé Purina Petcare continued integrating the two companies through 2002. It cut back dry dog food manufacturing at facilities inherited from Friskies PetCare Company in Jefferson, Wisconsin, St. Joseph, Missouri and Arden Hills, Minnesota, then moved those operations to manufacturing facilities acquired from Ralston. Expanded manufacturing facilities were planned in Dunkirk, New York and the St. Joseph location was later expanded for wet-food production. In Asia it shifted from a "dealer system" to managing its own distribution. In 2004 Nestlé Purina merged its North American and Latin America operations into a Nestlé Purina PetCare Americas division.

In 2003, Nestlé Purina Petcare formed a partnership with the Canine Health Foundation to advance veterinary research. The following year the company donated 80 tons of pet food to pets affected by Hurricane Charley in Florida and donated $100,000 to local animal shelters. Nestlé Purina Petcare grew from about 11 percent of Nestlé's revenues in 2001, to one-third by 2005. By 2006 it was the largest market-share holder in the pet food industry with 32 percent of the market.

Recent history

By 2009, Purina was one of Nestlé's fastest-growing divisions, due to an increasing willingness by consumers to spend more money on petcare. In 2008, it formed a separate company called PurinaCare with headquarters in San Antonio, Texas that sold pet insurance. PetCare was later acquired by Pethealth Inc. in 2013. By 2009 Purina had also introduced pet litter products and built new manufacturing facilities in Russia and Thailand. Its Colorado plant built the largest privately owned solar panel system in the state. In September 2010, Nestlé reached an agreement to acquire Waggin' Train, a producer of pet treats with $200 million in annual revenues.

In 2013, Nestlé Purina Petcare acquired the pet adoption website Petfinder. The following year it acquired Zuke's, a producer of cat and dog treats. From 2010 to 2012, Nestlé expanded its manufacturing operations in Australia, Hungary and Germany. It also implemented the company's largest solar panel farm at its facilities in Atlanta, Georgia. In April 2014, Nestlé Purina Petcare opened the first cat café in the US.

In February 2019, the company announced plans to spend $115 million to expand its factory in Bloomfield, Missouri, to support the demand for Tidy Cats. In November, the company invested $320 million in an old textile factory in Hartwell, Georgia.

In April 2020, Nestlé Purina Petcare acquired Lily's Kitchen, a UK-based natural pet food brand.

In November 2020, Purina announced Nina Leigh Krueger as the new company CEO. Krueger is the first female CEO of Nestlé Purina PetCare for the Americas. Purina's president and CEO, Nina Kruneger was named Chair of Pet Food Institute in 2023.

In January 2022, Purina took the #BettyWhiteChallenge in honor of the actress and pet-lover, Betty White. Purina joined the challenge through donating to organizations devoted to animals.

In February 2022, it was announced that Uber Pet and Nestlé Purina collaborated to facilitate the movement and travels of pet-owners.

In March 2022, Purina, along with officials from the American Pet Products Association, offered Pet Alliance of Greater Orlando with a $10,000 donation. The donation sought to help Pet Alliance of Greater Orlando reconstruct its 'facility' after the fire that shattered its 'public veterinary' and the majority of its 'shelter'.

In October 2022, Purina announced its partnership with Spot Pet which sought to catalyze ensuring the wellbeing of pets. By the end of 2022, Purina celebrated its 50 years of active production at its pet food factory in Dunkirk.

Purina has partnerships with several non-profit organizations, including Urban Resource Institute, which operates pet-friendly domestic violence shelters in New York City.

Legal issues
In May 2014, Nestlé Purina Petcare began a legal dispute with Blue Buffalo regarding its advertising practices.  Blue Buffalo advertised that its products contain no meat byproduct or corn, whereas Purina said independent lab tests confirmed that they do. Blue Buffalo made similar allegations against Purina in a counter-suit less than a week later. It also alleged Purina was engaging in what it characterized as a "smear campaign". The National Advertising Review Board and the Advertising Self-Regulatory Council found that Blue Buffalo's advertising was misleading and its claims that competitors were hiding information about their ingredients were unsubstantiated. Blue Buffalo said it disagreed, but would obey the ruling.

In 2015, after a dog died and others got sick, a class-action lawsuit was filed against Purina alleging that the company's Beneful brand of dog food contained propylene glycol and mycotoxins produced by mold found in grains – grain being a major ingredient in Beneful. The lawsuit was unsuccessful when the judge ruled that the plaintiff's attorneys did not prove that the food caused the dogs' illnesses, and the dog's death was found to have been caused by a heart tumor.

In April 2017, another lawsuit, regarding Purina's Beggin' line of dog treats and the accusation that its advertising fooled consumers into thinking that it was full of bacon, was dropped.

In January 2017 Nestlé Purina was responsible for the death of Tyson, a cat used in their testing facility. Tyson was boiled alive.

Recalls
In 2005, Nestlé Purina Petcare voluntarily recalled all of its dry pet food produced from a plant in La Encrucijada, Venezuela after an internal investigation verified contaminants that were causing illnesses in pets. According to Fortune Magazine, in 2007 the pet food market "plunged into turmoil" due to the widespread discovery of contaminated ingredients. During this period, Nestle Purina voluntarily recalled some of its Alpo Prime Cuts in Gravy product in the US that contained wheat gluten from China contaminated with melamine.

In August 2013 Purina recalled some of its Purina ONE Beyond dog food, because of one bag that was found to contain salmonella. In 2012 a consumer sued Nestlé Purina Petcare when his pet died after eating Waggin' Train treats. The Food and Drug Administration received more than 900 reports from grieving pet owners that alleged the treat was causing illness or death in their pets due to chicken products from China. The FDA had issued warnings regarding these ingredients, but lab tests repeatedly confirmed there were no contaminants. Later that year, another consumer started a petition on Change.org asking retailers to voluntarily stop carrying the product. The petition attracted 60,000 signatures. The following year, Waggin' Train and Canyon Creek dog treats were voluntarily taken off the market temporarily after the New York State Department of Agriculture and Markets identified trace amounts of antibiotic residue, which is allowed in Europe and China, but not approved in the US. In early 2014, a $6.5 million settlement was reached, pending approval by the court. According to The Washington Post, the company later re-introduced the brands after "revamping its manufacturing process and overhauling its supply chain".

Products and services
According to a SWOT analysis by MarketLine, Nestlé Purina Petcare's pet food brands that contribute substantially to revenue include Purina, Purina Dog Chow, Friskies, Purina Beneful and Purina ONE. Some brands, such as Alpo are intended for budget shoppers, while others like Purina ONE and Beneful cost more and are for health or ingredient conscious consumers. Purina ONE has been its fastest-growing brand.

The company introduced an appetizer cat food, Fancy Feast Appetizers, in 2009. A Purina Pro Plan line for senior dogs was introduced in 2010. It contains medium chain triglycerides (MCTs) for brain function and has whole grains for digestion. A grain-free product, Purina ONE Beyond, was introduced in 2011. Purina Pro Plan Sport, which contains extra fat and protein and is intended for athletic dogs, was made available in 2013. In 2014 Purina introduced a product for the growing Brazilian market called Ravena, which used locally available ingredients, such as acerola and jabuticaba fruits. Purina-branded accessories, such as training pads, beds, leashes and cleaners began being sold in 2011 under the Purina PetGear name through brand licensing agreements with other manufacturers.

Purina's significant brands and product lines include:

Marketing and advertising
In the mid-1970s, the Purina Cat Chow brand launched the "Chow-Chow-Chow" advertising campaign, variations of which would run for the next 20 years. The television commercials featured cats seemingly dancing the cha-cha-cha, by means of a post-production and editing trick that involved rapidly playing the film forward and backward, giving the humorous illusion of the cats dancing as they walked or ran in time with the music. The earliest such spots featured character actress Patsy Garrett, who would appear in several other Cat Chow spots as an official spokesperson for many more years.

In 2006, Nestlé Purina Petcare introduced a sponsored email application, Doggie-Mail, that could send messages online through a talking dog. In 2009 it sponsored the PawNation.com site developed by AOL, which hosted crowd-sourced pet videos, tips, Q&As and other content about pet ownership. Purina also sponsored Martha Stewart's pet tips site, Living Omnimedia. The company introduced an advertising campaign for the Alpo brand with the slogan "Real dogs eat meat". In the ad, over-pampered pets were "rescued" and fed Alpo, implying that pets needed to stay in touch with their primal nature by eating real meat. In 2009 it released a free iPhone app called "petcentric places" that allows users to map local pet-related locations, like dog parks or pet-friendly hotels. In 2010, Purina released a branded Facebook game called Purina Pet Resort, where players manage a virtual pet resort.

In 2011, Nestlé Purina Petcare became the official sponsor of the Westminster show hosted by the American Kennel Club. The company introduced a competition for pet owners to win a part-time job earning $50,000 annually to travel with their cat, interview other pet owners and write for the Purina website. Nestle Purina also produced television advertisements intended for Austria that had audio effects only pets could hear. It was the first set of advertisements targeting pets directly, rather than their owners.

In 2012, Purina and another Nestlé business, Jenny Craig, jointly created "Project: Pet Slim Down", an online program intended to help pets and pet owners lose weight together. Grumpy Cat became a "spokescat" for the Friskies brand in late 2013. In 2013, Purina featured ads during the Westminster Show that featured crowd-sourced videos submitted to Purina in response to the question "How is Your Dog Great?"

Operations

Headquarters 
Nestlé Purina Petcare is operated as a subsidiary of Nestlé. It is headquartered in St Louis, Missouri and has operations in North America, Asia, Africa, Europe, Latin America and Oceania. There are sixteen buildings on 50 acres at its headquarters, including a 15-story main tower, four-story research facility built in 2010 and a Learning and Training center built in 2011. In 2010, Purina built the $10 million Purina Event Center for dog shows and competitions. Nestlé Purina Petcare sponsors various charitable activities, such as the Pet Care Pride Day annual event where employees do volunteer work. Employees are allowed to bring their pets to work. The company has on-site gyms, physical fitness trainers, medical care, and an employee turnover of approximately 5 percent. NestlePurina also has its own in-house creative agency called, CheckMark. Purina's St Louis headquarters houses between 2,500 and 3000 employees and also houses IT and auditing departments as part of Nestle Shared Services.

Statistics 
As of 2005, Purina Petcare was Nestlé's second most profitable division behind pharmaceuticals. It was the largest pet food manufacturer by market share in the US and the second-largest in Europe. As of 2012, globally Purina has a 23.1 percent share of the pet food market, while its largest competitor, Mars, has a 23.4 percent share. According to a Research and Markets report, competition between Nestlé and Mars has been "fierce."

In 2010, Nestlé Purina Petcare won the Malcolm Baldrige National Quality Award based on organizational and manufacturing performance. Its manufacturing operations have continuously reduced the amount of materials used in packaging, increased the recycling of waste product and reduced water usage, in addition to installing solar panels to produce electricity for its offices and facilities. In 2011, Nestlé Purina Petcare was ranked as one of 11 most sustainable companies in Two Tomorrow's annual ranking. As of 2014, it has 19 manufacturing plants.

See also
W. Patrick McGinnis, former president and CEO (2001–2015), then non-executive chairman (2015–2017)

References

Notes

External links
 

Ralston Purina
Nestlé brands
Cat food brands
Dog food brands
Food and drink companies of the United States
American companies established in 2001
Food and drink companies established in 2001
2001 establishments in Missouri
American subsidiaries of foreign companies